Hochfranken (English: High Franconia) is a region in north-eastern Bavaria and is part of Upper Franconia (Oberfranken). It comprises Landkreis Hof Hof and Wunsiedel im Fichtelgebirge Wunsiedel districts.

References

Hof (district)
Wunsiedel (district)